Alexander David Smith (born 6 March 1988) is an English track and field athlete competing in the hammer throw.

Life and career
Born in Hull, he is the son of Dave Smith, a former Commonwealth Games champion in the hammer. His first international medal came at the 2005 World Youth Championships in Athletics, where he was the bronze medallist.

In 2010 he finished second at the 2010 Commonwealth Games in Delhi with a personal best of 72.95 metres. He improved his personal best to 75.63 m in 2012 and was selected to represent Great Britain at the London 2012 Olympic Games, where he reached the final and finished 12th.  At the 2014 Commonwealth Games, he finished 4th with a throw of 70.99m.

References

External links
 
 
 
  (2014)
  (2010)
 

1988 births
Living people
Sportspeople from Kingston upon Hull
British male hammer throwers
English male hammer throwers
Olympic male hammer throwers
Olympic athletes of Great Britain
Athletes (track and field) at the 2012 Summer Olympics
Commonwealth Games silver medallists for England
Commonwealth Games medallists in athletics
Athletes (track and field) at the 2010 Commonwealth Games
Athletes (track and field) at the 2014 Commonwealth Games
British Athletics Championships winners
Medallists at the 2010 Commonwealth Games